Dead Babies is Martin Amis's second novel, published in 1975 by Jonathan Cape. It was published in paperback as Dark Secrets. Amis's second novel—a parody of Agatha Christie's country-house mysteries—takes place over a single weekend at a manor called Appleseed Rectory. In 2000, the book was adapted into a film of the same name, starring Paul Bettany and Olivia Williams. In 2001, BBC critic David Wood wrote "Amis's second novel ranks among his most incendiary with its mordant wit, black comedy, and sense of the violently absurd."

Further reading

References

1975 British novels
Novels by Martin Amis
British novels adapted into films
Jonathan Cape books